Chinkara Motors, officially Chinkara Motors PVT Ltd, was a Mumbai, Maharashtra-based auto, marine, ATV and aviation manufacturer. Chinkara operated from 2003 to 2016.

Automotive 
Chingara primarily manufactured a 2-seat sports car called the Chinkara Roadster 1.8S, and the Jeepster, a classic 1940s Jeep look-alike. The vehicles were developed at Alibag near Mumbai, India. The name Chinkara comes from a local word  for an  Indian Gazelle.

Chinkara Roadster 1.8S

The Chinkara Roadster is derived from the Lotus 7. The car is put together out of parts from various Indian cars, including the Maruti 800 and the now defunct Standard Herald. While this allows the car to be reasonably advanced, it allows the use of intermediate technology to compete with a western equivalent that may be more an advanced. For example, news articles on the car say it uses MacPherson struts front and rear taken from a Maruti Alto. The Roadster is available in several levels of tuning.

Price: INR 740,000 (excluding taxes)
Engine: In-line, Isuzu 4 cylinder, 1.8 liter/1816 cc (Petrol),  @ 5000 rpm,  @ 3000 rpm
Transmission: Five-speed Manual
Brakes: Ventilated disc (front and rear)
Tyres: Front – 205/50 R16, Rear – 225/50 R15 Goodyear F1 tubeless
Performance: 6.7sec 0–100 km/h, 187 km/h, 13kmpl (all figures claimed)
Length: 
Width: 
Height: 
Weight:

Jeepster
The Jeepster is an off-road vehicle similar to the classic Willys Jeep. With its body constructed of lightweight FRP, the Jeepster can be delivered with a diesel engine or a 1.8L Isuzu petrol.

Other automotive products
Chinkara Motors also produced the following automotive products:

Hammer – a sandrail fast attack vehicle for the Indian defence forces
Rockster – All-terrain vehicle
Beachster – Dune buggy
Sailster – Wind-powered land vehicle
Motor homes

Marine products
The Marine division specialized in the manufacture of Fiber-Reinforced Plastic multi-hull (Catamarans & Trimarans) watercraft. They produced both powered and sailboat catamarans and powered trimarans Chinkara also builds the	Wave Striker power catamaran and Predator powered trimaran work boats.

Aviation Products
The Aviation division produced GFP gliders and powered gliders, Gyrocopters and Microlights.

References

External links
 Chinkara webpage
 the Business Standard Motoring page and search for Chinkara.
 The Chinkara roadster by BM
 Press review
 Business Standard Motoring: Deers for steers
 Autocar India: Drive Chinkara

Defunct motor vehicle manufacturers of India
Manufacturing companies based in Mumbai
Sports car manufacturers
Lotus Seven replicas
Indian brands
2003 establishments in Maharashtra
2016 disestablishments in India
Indian companies established in 2003
Indian companies disestablished in 2016
Vehicle manufacturing companies established in 2003
Vehicle manufacturing companies disestablished in 2016